Starlink satellite services in Ukraine refers to the SpaceX's Starlink internet access service being provided to Ukraine's market.  This service was most notably used during the 2022 Russian invasion of Ukraine, as Russian attacks brought widespread degradation of the telecommunications network.  During the battle of Mariupol (2022), Starlink was used to report on the worsening conditions inside the city. 

As of 5 April 2022, SpaceX and USAID had delivered 5,000 terminals to Ukraine, of which SpaceX had donated 3,667 or 73%, and the rest had been purchased by USAID.

Negotiations 
SpaceX had been negotiating with Ukraine for the launch of Starlink a month and a half before the invasion, SpaceX president Gwynne Shotwell said. According to her, SpaceX was waiting for an official letter with permission.

At the beginning of the surprise Russian's invasion of Ukraine in 2022 and as Russia attacked key infrastructures including telecommunication ones, Ukraine experienced significant problems with Internet access. Maintaining internet access was seen as a priority by Ukraine's military and other government bodies.

Services

Early services 

On February 26, 2022 during the battle for Kyiv, Minister of Digital Transformation of Ukraine Mykhailo Fedorov asked Elon Musk on Twitter to provide assistance to Ukraine in the form of Starlinks. Starlink responded by activating country-wide service, and the first shipment of terminals arrived on February 28.

Satellite internet from SpaceX had key telecommunications role in the Siege of Azovstal (April 15–May 20), which helps Ukrainian defenders to resist Russian troops in Mariupol. On March 21, two helicopters of "Operation Air Corridor" (March 21–April 7) carried Ukrainian Special Forces fighters, weaponry and the first Starlink terminal behind enemies lines to besieged Mariupol.

In early May, the Russian head of Roscosmos and politician Dmitry Rogozin said Elon Musk will be accountable "as an adult" because of his providing the Armed Forces of Ukraine with Starlink satellites.

Starlink internet also started being used on the trains of Ukrainian Railways, during the restoration of communication in the Kyiv Oblast providing mobile communication services.

Growth 
In an interview to The Washington Post, Mykhailo Fedorov said that European countries have sent Starlink terminals to Ukraine from their own supplies.

Over time, the number of Starlink satellite terminals donated by SpaceX began to grow.  Ukrainian government bodies also started fundraising money to purchase more terminals. In June 2022, Ukraine received a new batch of antenna for Ukrainian intelligence units.

On October 7, a report by the Financial Times quoted several Ukrainian officials criticising Starlink, speaking of "widespread connection failures" and "catastrophic" losses of communication.

October 2022 controversy 
On October 14, 2022, following Musk's controversial takes on the war, path to peace, and president Volodymyr Zelenskyy's questioning of Musk's allegiances, Musk warned the service was costing Starlink $20 million per month and stated it could not go on indefinitely. Documents and customers billings show that both private and governmental agencies, mostly from US, Poland and the United Kingdom, are contributing for Starlink services in addition to SpaceX's donations. Musk re-committed on October 15 that SpaceX would continue to pay for Starlink services.

Drone control 

The Times reported in March 2022, that the Ukrainian military was using Starlink to connect its drones attacking Russian forces.

On February 8, 2023 Gwynne Shotwell, President of Starlink, announced that the company had taken measures to prevent the use of Starlink service to control combat drones, saying the company did not intend that the service be "weaponized".

See also 
 List of foreign aid to Ukraine during the Russo-Ukrainian War
 Corporate responses to the 2022 Russian invasion of Ukraine
 United24

References 

Reactions to the 2022 Russian invasion of Ukraine
Economic history of Ukraine
Development in Europe
SpaceX satellites
Internet in Ukraine